The Hollow Tree and Deep Woods Book is a children's book of short stories by Albert Bigelow Paine. It was published first in 1898 as an edition in one volume of The Hollow Tree and In the Deep Woods with several new stories and pictures added.

The book has 28 animal stories, notably tales of the 'Coon, the 'Possum, and the Old Black Crow, which live in the Hollow Tree in the Deep Woods.

These books contain pen-and-ink illustrations by J. M. Condé.

The Hollow Tree Series
The Hollow Tree and Deep Woods Book (1898)
The Hollow Tree Snowed-In Book (1910)
Hollow Tree Nights and Days (1915)

External links
 

1898 short story collections
Children's short story collections
American short story collections
American children's books
Animal tales
1890s children's books